is a Japanese manga series written by Buronson and illustrated by Ryoichi Ikegami, published Shogakukan's Big Comic Superior from 1996 to 1998.

Plot 
Mayo is a professional assassin who is hired by the "Organization" to kill the mother of a young prostitute, Shion. Shion pleads with Mayo, and convinces him to give up on his mission.

As Mayo takes pity on Shion and her mother, who offer him more money, the leaders of the Organization pronounce a death sentence on him.

Volumes

External links
 "Untranslated pick of the month" -(J-pop.com)

Ryoichi Ikegami
Seinen manga
Shogakukan manga
Viz Media manga
Yoshiyuki Okamura